The 2007 Columbus mayoral election took place on November 6, 2007, to elect the mayor of Columbus, Ohio. The election was officially nonpartisan. Since there were fewer than three candidates, no primary was necessary.

Incumbent mayor Michael B. Coleman was reelected.

Results

References

2007
2007 Ohio elections
Columbus